Plaza is a neighborhood of Long Beach, California, located adjacent to El Dorado Park West. It is part of the greater "East Long Beach" area.

History
Plaza was originally built in several phases as part of the Lakewood, California subdivision Lakewood Plaza. According to the Long Beach Press-Telegram's March 13, 1953 edition, residents  in Lakewood Plaza units 3, 4 and 5 voted to become the first Lakewood area choosing to be annexed into Long Beach. The Press-Telegram reported that "the half-mile square area joining the city is bounded by Spring St., Studebaker Rd., Stearns St., and Palo Verde Ave."

Since the early 1960s, various grocery stores have operated at the intersection of Palo Verde and Spring.

Location
Plaza is in East Long Beach, entirely north of Interstate 405. Its borders are Stearns Street to the south and Studebaker Road to the east. The western borders are Palo Verde Ave. (to Spring Street) and Woodruff Ave. (to Conant Street). East Long Beach's primary shopping and dining district, East Spring Street, is located in the Plaza area.

Education
Plaza residents are served by Long Beach Unified School District schools:
 Cubberley K-8 School
 Emerson Parkside Academy
 Leland Stanford Middle School
 Millikan High School

See also
Neighborhoods of Long Beach, California

References

Neighborhoods in Long Beach, California